Henry Bainbridge McCarter (1864-1942) was an American illustrator and painter known for his influence on the modernistic art movements. McCarter worked as an illustrator in New York before becoming an instructor at the Pennsylvania Academy of the Fine Arts for forty years. He won numerous medals for illustration, watercolor and oil painting including the 1938 Temple Gold Medal.

Early life and education
McCarter was born 5 July 1864 in Norristown, Pennsylvania. In 1879, he began attending the Pennsylvania Academy of the Fine arts where one of his instructors was Thomas Eakins. However, he described the five years of his studies there as "lost years." In 1887, he went to Paris where he studied with Puvis de Chavannes, Léon Bonnat and Thomas Alexander Harrison of the École nationale supérieure des Beaux-Arts.

Career
While in Paris, McCarter became an apprentice in lithography to Toulouse Lautrec. He then returned to the USA and moved to New York to work as a graphic illustrator. McCarter drew illustrations for Scribners, Harpers, McClure's and Collier's magazines, among others. He also taught at the Art Students League of New York. In 1902 he accepted a position as a watercolor teacher and the first instructor of illustration at his former school, the Pennsylvania Academy of the Fine Arts in Philadelphia. He was an instructor there for the next forty years. Although he began as an illustrator, by the 1920s McCarter concentrated on watercolor and oil painting of still lifes and landscapes.

According to the art curator W. Douglass Paschal, McCarter "sought a path merging the compositional structures, brushwork and strong coloration of the Post-Impressionists and Fauves he admired." McCarter became a strong advocate for modernism among his students at PAFA. Students who McCarter influenced included Franklin C. Watkins, Charles Demuth, Norman Carton, and Arthur B. Carles.

Awards
Prizes awarded to McCarter included: bronze medal at the Buffalo Exposition (1901), silver medal at the Louisiana Purchase Exposition (1904), gold medal at the Panama–Pacific International Exposition (1915), the Beck Prize at the Pennsylvania Academy of Fine Arts (PAFA),  the Joseph Pennell Memorial Prize for watercolor, PAFA (1940), the gold medal from Art Club of Philadelphia (1936), Temple Gold Medal at the 134th Annual Exhibition of Pennsylvania Academy of the Fine Arts (1938).

He won the Fellowship Gold Medal for his “dreamlike and ethereal” oil painting titled Old Trappe Church in 1941.

Personal life
McCarter neither married nor had children. He died of a heart attack on 20 November 1942 in Norristown, Pennsylvania, aged 76. McCarter was buried at the Church of Messiah Cemetery in Gwynedd, Pennsylvania

Selected works

Further reading
Armstrong, Regina (June 1899) "A Group of Pictorial Illustrators: Henry McCarter - F.C. Yohn - Walter Appleton Clark" Art Exchange, vol. 42, no. 6 p. 128
Ingersoll, R. Sturgis, (1944) Henry McCarter, Riverside Press, Cambridge, MA

References

1864 births
1942 deaths
Artists from Philadelphia
Painters from Pennsylvania
American male painters
American landscape painters
19th-century American painters
19th-century American male artists
20th-century American painters
Pennsylvania Academy of the Fine Arts alumni
20th-century American male artists